The 1852 United States presidential election in Michigan took place on November 2, 1852, as part of the 1852 United States presidential election. Voters chose six representatives, or electors to the Electoral College, who voted for President and Vice President.

Michigan voted for the Democratic candidate, Franklin Pierce, over Whig candidate Winfield Scott and Free Soil candidate John P. Hale. Pierce won Michigan by a margin of 9.62%.

, this is the last and only time Sanilac County voted for a Democratic presidential candidate. It would be the last time Michigan would send a full slate of Democratic electors to the Electoral College until Franklin Delano Roosevelt in 1932, although it did send five Grover Cleveland electors in 1892.

Results

See also
 United States presidential elections in Michigan

References

Michigan
1852
1852 Michigan elections